The  is a transportation company in Toyama, Toyama Prefecture, Japan. This private company operates railway, tram, and bus services in the eastern part of the prefecture. It also operates as the agency of All Nippon Airways in Toyama area. The company has its root in  founded in 1930. The current company was founded in 1943, when all the private and public operators of railway, tram, and bus lines in the prefecture were merged into one. In 1950, it founded Kaetsunō Railway, planning to build the railway line that links Toyama and Ishikawa. Chitetsu handed over its networks in the western part of Toyama Prefecture, although the plan never came to fruition.

Lines

Railway lines
 Toyama Chiho Railway Main Line (本線): Dentetsu-Toyama — Unazuki-Onsen
 Toyama Chiho Railway Tateyama Line (立山線): Terada — Tateyama
 Fujikoshi-Kamidaki Line: These two lines are treated as a single line.
Fujikoshi Line (不二越線): Inarimachi — Minami-Toyama
Kamidaki Line (上滝線): Minami-Toyama — Iwakuraji
All the trains from Tateyama Line and Fujikoshi-Kamidaki Line have through services to the Main Line, reaching Dentetsu-Toyama.

Tram lines

Lines
The tram lines are collectively called the Toyama City Tram Line, officially consisting of five lines.
Main Line (本線): Minami-Toyama-Ekimae — Toyama-Ekimae
This is a different line from ■ Main Line (railway).
Branch Line (支線): Toyama-Ekimae — Marunouchi
Yasunoya Line (安野屋線): Marunouchi — Yasunoya
Kureha Line (呉羽線): Yasunoya — Daigaku-mae
Toyama Toshin Line (富山都心線): Marunouchi — Nishichō
Toyamakō Line (富山港線): Toyama-Ekimae — Iwasehama

Routes
The tram operates in two routes. The Main, Branch, Yasunoya and Kureha lines effectively make a single route, from Minami-Toyama-Ekimae to Daigaku-mae. Some tramcars run between Minami-Toyama-Ekimae and Toyama-Ekimae. The Branch Line, the Toyama Toshin Line and a part of the Main Line form a circle route in the city center. The latter route was introduced in December 2009 when the Toyama Toshin Line opened.

There is a plan to link Toyama-Ekimae Station and Toyamaekikita Station of Toyama Light Rail, currently 250 m away. After two tram lines are linked, they will have a through service.

Bus lines
The company operates local bus lines in the whole eastern part of the prefecture, including Toyama City. It also operates many highway buses linking Toyama City and other parts of Japan, including Tokyo, Osaka, Nagoya, and Kanazawa.

Related companies
Kaetsunō Railway
Tateyama Kurobe Kankō

See also
List of railway companies in Japan
List of light-rail transit systems

External links 

  

Railway companies of Japan
Bus companies of Japan
Tram transport in Japan
Railway companies established in 1943